The 17th Asian Athletics Championships were held on the Amman International Stadium in Amman, Jordan between 25 July and 29 July 2007. It was moved in the last minute from original host country Lebanon due to the unrest in that country.

Countries like China did not send their best athletes, instead choosing to prepare for the 2007 World Championships which were staged a month later.

Results

Men

Women

Medals table

Participating nations

See also
2007 in athletics (track and field)

References

Results
Results, day 1 - Asian Athletics Association (archived)
Results, day 2 - Asian Athletics Association (archived)
Results, day 3 - Asian Athletics Association (archived)
Results, day 4 - Asian Athletics Association (archived)
Results, day 5 - Asian Athletics Association (archived)
Asian Championships - GBR Athletics

Daily reports

External links
Asian Athletics Association

 
Asian Athletics Championships
Asian Championships
International athletics competitions hosted by Jordan
Sports competitions in Amman
Asian
2007 in Asian sport
July 2007 sports events in Asia